{{Album ratings
| rev1 = Allmusic
| rev1Score = <ref name=""allmusic"">{{cite web|url=https://www.allmusic.com/album/never-say-never-mw0000870463|title=Never Say Never|work=Allmusic|accessdate=2021-11-15}}</ref>}}Never Say Never is the thirteenth album by American singer Melba Moore. It was released by Capitol Records on November 14, 1983. This album featured the hits "Keeping My Lover Satisfied", "Livin' for Your Love" and "Love Me Right" peaking at number 9 on the US Billboard'' Top R&B/Hip Hop Albums chart and number 147 on the Billboard 200. This album was notable for a remake of her 1976 hit "Lean on Me".

Track listing

Charts

Weekly charts

Year-end charts

References

1983 albums
Melba Moore albums
Capitol Records albums